Golo Brdo is a settlement northwest of Ljubljana in Slovenia. It lies within the Municipality of Medvode in the Upper Carniola region.

Church

The church in Golo Brdo is dedicated to the Trinity. It is also known as Holy Spirit Church.

References

External links 

Golo Brdo on Geopedia

Populated places in the Municipality of Medvode